is a Japanese footballer who plays for FC TIAMO Hirakata.

Club statistics
Updated to 23 February 2018.

References

External links

Profile at SC Sagamihara

1993 births
Living people
People from Ayase, Kanagawa
Association football people from Kanagawa Prefecture
Japanese footballers
J2 League players
J3 League players
Fagiano Okayama players
SC Sagamihara players
FC Tiamo Hirakata players
Association football midfielders